Lost Horizon is a fantasy adventure novel by James Hilton.

Lost Horizon or Lost Horizons may also refer to:

Film and television
Lost Horizon (1937 film), an adaptation of the novel
Lost Horizon (1973 film), a remake of the 1937 film
"Lost Horizon" (Mad Men), an episode of the television series Mad Men

Music
Lost Horizon (band), a Swedish metal band
Lost Horizons (Lemon Jelly album), 2002
Lost Horizons (Luca Turilli's Dreamquest album), 2006
Lost Horizons (Abney Park album), 2008
"Lost Horizons" (Gin Blossoms song), 1992

Other uses
Lost Horizon (video game), an adventure game by Animation Arts